Reda Kharchouch (born 27 August 1995) is a Dutch professional footballer who plays as a forward for Excelsior.

Career

Telstar
In May 2019, Kharchouch got his first chance in professional football, signing a two-year deal with Telstar. He made his league debut for the club on 16 August 2019 in a 1–0 victory over Den Bosch.

Emmen
On 17 August 2021, he joined Emmen on loan with an option to buy.

Excelsior
On 12 July 2022, Kharchouch signed a three-year contract with Excelsior.

Personal life
Born in the Netherlands, Kharchouch is of Moroccan descent.

References

External links

Living people
1995 births
Dutch sportspeople of Moroccan descent
Dutch footballers
Footballers from Amsterdam
Association football forwards
Eredivisie players
Eerste Divisie players
Derde Divisie players
Quick Boys players
OFC Oostzaan players
SC Telstar players
Sparta Rotterdam players
FC Emmen players
Excelsior Rotterdam players